John Edward Browning (born September 30, 1973) is a former American football defensive tackle.  He played in 24 regular season games (12 starts) for West Virginia University, tallying 78 tackles, 8 sacks, a fumble recovery and a pass deflection.  He was drafted in the 1996 NFL Draft 3rd round by the Kansas City Chiefs.

References

1973 births
Living people
American football defensive tackles
West Virginia Mountaineers football players
Kansas City Chiefs players
Denver Broncos players
Players of American football from Miami
Ed Block Courage Award recipients